Rajivdada Deshmukh is an Indian politician and a member of the Nationalist Congress Party, and son of Anildada Deshmukh. He was a Member of the Maharashtra Legislative Assembly from the Chalisgaaon constituency.

References

Year of birth missing (living people)
Living people
Nationalist Congress Party politicians from Maharashtra
Place of birth missing (living people)
Maharashtra MLAs 2009–2014
People from Jalgaon district